The 2013 ESPY Awards were announced from the Nokia Theatre on July 17, 2013 and were live on ESPN. ESPY Award is short for Excellence in Sports Performance Yearly Award.
The awards show was hosted by Jon Hamm.

Winners

Best Female Athlete: Serena Williams, Tennis
Best Male Athlete: LeBron James, Miami Heat
Best Team: Miami Heat
Best Coach/Manager: Rick Pitino, Louisville Cardinals men's basketball
Best Comeback Player: Adrian Peterson, Minnesota Vikings
Best Game  -– San Antonio Spurs vs. Miami Heat, NBA Finals Game 6 
Best Moment—Jack Hoffman, 7 year old cancer patient rushes for touchdown at Nebraska spring game 
Best Play—Hit by Jadeveon Clowney.
Best Championship Performance -- LeBron James, Miami Heat
Best Upset -— #15 Florida Gulf Coast beats #2 Georgetown in 2nd round of 2013 NCAA Men's Division I Basketball Tournament 
Best Male College Athlete -- Johnny Manziel, Texas A&M
Best Female College Athlete -- Brittney Griner, Baylor
Best International Athlete -- Usain Bolt, Sprinter
Best Record-Breaking Performance -- Michael Phelps, Swimmer
Breakthrough Athlete of the Year -- Colin Kaepernick, San Francisco 49ers
Best Male Action Sports Athlete --Nyjah Huston, Skateboarder 
Best Female Action Sports Athlete -- Stephanie Gilmore, Surfer 
Best Male Athlete with a Disability -- Jeremy Campbell, Pentathlon, Discus 
Best Female Athlete with a Disability -- Jessica Long, Swimming 
Best Male Olympic Athlete — Michael Phelps, Swimmer 
Best Female Olympic Athlete — Missy Franklin, Swimmer 
Best Driver -- Ryan Hunter-Reay, IndyCar Series
Fighter of the Year -- Floyd Mayweather, Boxing 
NBA Player of the Year— LeBron James, Miami Heat 
NFL Player of the Year -- Adrian Peterson, Minnesota Vikings 
NHL Player of the Year -- Sidney Crosby, Pittsburgh Penguins
MLB Player of the Year -- Miguel Cabrera, Detroit Tigers
WNBA Player of the Year -- Candace Parker, Los Angeles Sparks 
Best Bowler -- Pete Weber
Best Female Golfer -- Stacy Lewis 
Best Male Golfer -- Tiger Woods
Best Jockey -- Joel Rosario 
Best MLS Player -- Thierry Henry, Red Bulls
Best Male Tennis Player -- Novak Djokovic 
Best Female Tennis Player -- Serena Williams

References

External links
Official Site

2013
ESPY
ESPY
ESPY
ESPY